Biswanath (IPA: ˌbɪswəˈnɑːθ ˈtʃɑːrɪˌælɪ) was an administrative district in the state of Assam in India till December 2022. It is one of newly created district in the year by 2015, declared by Assam Chief Minister Tarun Gogoi on 15 August 2015. The district is now part of Sonitpur district.

The district is created amalgamating Gohpur and most part of Biswanath Sub division on earlier Sonitpur district. The district is bounded by Arunachal Pradesh on north, Golaghat, Brahmaputra river on the south, Lakhimpur district on the east and Sonitpur district on the west. The administrative headquarter is located at Biswanath Chariali.

On 31 December 2022, the district remerged with existing Sonitpur district ahead of delimitation process by ECI in the state.

History
The major part of Biswanath district formed a part of the Chutiya kingdom until it was annexed in the 16th century by the Ahoms. The western part of the district was under the rule of independent Bhuyan chieftains. The border between the Chutia kingdom and Bhuyan principalities were marked by the Dikarai  and the Ghiladhari rivers. The Chutia kings built many forts in the region which included the Buroi fort (near Nyishi hills) and the Pratapgarh fort built by king Pratap Narayan.

Administration
 Headquarter  Biswanath Chariali
 Name of Sub-Divisions  Biswanath Chariali, Gohpur
 Name of Revenue Circles/ Tehsils  Biswanath Chariali, Gohpur, Helem
 Name of Development(C.D.) Blocks  
 Pub-Chaiduar Development Block
 Chaiduar Development Block
 Behali Development Block
 Baghmora Development Block
 Biswanath Development Block
 Sakomotha development Block
 Sotea Development Block  
 Name of Police Stations   
 Gohpur Police Station
 Helem Police Station
 Behali Police Station
 Ginjia Police Station
 Biswanath Chariali Police Station
 Sootea Police Station
 Hawajan Police Outpost
 Borgang Police Outpost 
 Number of Villages            832    
 Names of Towns                Biswanath Chariali, Gohpur 
 Name of Town Committees       Biswanath Chariali, Gohpur

Demographics 
According to the 2011 census, Biswanath district has a population of 612,491. Scheduled Castes and Scheduled Tribes make up 43,763 (7.15%) and 93,174 (15.21%) of the population respectively.

As of the 2011 census, Hindus made up 514,259 (83.96%), while Muslims made up 52,155 (8.52%) and Christians (6.92%) of the population respectively.

At the time of the 2011 census, 34.06% of the population speaks Assamese, 13.56% Sadri, 8.58% Bengali, 7.93% Nepali, 7.23% Boro, 7.09% Mising, 6.76% Odia, 3.41% Mundari, 2.56% Karbi and 1.84% Hindi as their first language.

Railway Station
 Dubia
 Gohpur
 Brahmajan
 Helem
 Niz Borgang
 Monabari
 Viswanath Chariali
 Niz Sotea

Notes

References

External links
 Official website

 
Districts of Assam
2015 establishments in Assam